Nagid is a Hebrew term meaning a prince or leader. This title was often applied to the religious leader in Sephardic communities of the Middle Ages. In Egypt, the Jewish Nagid was appointed over all the Jews living under the dominion of the king of Egypt; he was invested with all the power of a king and could punish and imprison those who acted in opposition to his decrees; his duty was also to appoint the Dayyanim (judges) in every city.

According to Muslim scholars, the role of the Nagid (or Ra’īs) was to represent the Rabbanite majority, but also to represent the minority groups of the Karaites and Samaritans as well. Accordingly, his function was to "join the Jews together and to prevent their separation," mainly by serving them as legal authority in accordance with their laws and customs.

Among the individuals bearing this title are the following (Dates refer to lifespan, not when this title was held.):
 Samuel ibn Naghrillah (Shmuel Ha-Naggid), 
 Sa'adya ben Mevorakh, 999-?
 David ben Daniel, 
 Joseph ibn Naghrela (Yosef Ha-Naggid), 1035-1066
 Yehudah "Judah" ben Sa'adya, 1020-1080
 Abū 'l-Faḍl Mevorakh ben Saʿadya, 1040-1111
 Nethan'el ben Mevorakh, 1098-
 , 
 , 
 Sar Shalom ben Moses, ?-1204
 Maimonides, 1138-1204
 Abraham ben Moses ben Maimon, 1186-1237
 , 1222-1300
 , c. 1246–c. 1316
 Yehoshua Hanagid, 1310-1355
 , 1335?-1415?

See also
Exilarch
Nasi (Hebrew title)
Hakham Bashi
Chief Rabbi

References

External links
Jewish Encyclopedia: Gaon and Nagid

Hebrew words and phrases
Orthodox rabbinic roles and titles
Sephardi Jews topics
Jewish leadership roles

he:נגיד